Raoul II may refer to:

 Raoul II of Tosny (died 1102)
 Raoul II of Lusignan (c. 1200 – ?)
 Raoul II, Lord of Coucy (died 1250)
 Raoul II Sores, marshal of France briefly in 1270
 Raoul II of Brienne, Count of Eu (d. 1350)
 Raoul II de Clermont (?–1302)